Dennis Hodgetts (28 November 1863 – 25/26 March 1945), commonly known as Denny Hodgetts, was a footballer in the early years of professional football in England. 

Signed as a Youth player for Mitchell St George's in 1878 and played for three years.

When 17 he signed for Great Lever for the 1881-82 season.

In 1882 he returned to Mitchell St. George's F.C. where he stayed for four years.

Hodgetts signed for Aston Villa in  February 1886. The following year he scored the first goal in Aston Villa's first FA Cup final triumph. In 1895 he collected another FA Cup winners medal with Villa. Hodgetts was also a key member of the Football League title-winning sides of 1894 and 1896.

Season 1888-89

Hodgetts was described as powerful and alert and good with both feet. He could shoot and pass expertly. He was outstanding at crossing the ball on the run. He played in Aston Villa' opening League game, as a winger, at Dudley Road, Wolverhampton, then home of Wolverhampton Wanderers F.C.|Wolverhampton Wanderers]]. The match ended 1-1. Denny Hodgetts played 17 of the 22 League games Aston Villa played in season 1888-89 scoring seven League goals (including 2 in a match against Everton at Dudley Road on 22 September 1888 - His debut League goal (s)) and 3 FA Cup goals finishing as Joint 3rd top scorer with Archie Hunter. As a winger he played in a midfield that achieved a big (three-League-goals-or-more-in-a-match) win on four occasions. He assisted Aston Villa to finish League runners-up.

On the eve of Villa's Double-winning success in 1897 (in what would have been his third FA Cup final with Villa) Hodgetts transferred to local rivals Small Heath before retiring in 1898.

He made six appearances for England between 1888 and 1894, scoring once.

He went on to become a publican, and in 1930 was elected Aston Villa's vice-president, a position he held until his death, aged 81, in March 1945.

The Villa News and Record 1 Sept. 1906

Statistics
Source:

References

External links

1863 births
1945 deaths
Footballers from Birmingham, West Midlands
English footballers
England international footballers
Birmingham St George's F.C. players
Aston Villa F.C. players
Birmingham City F.C. players
English Football League representative players
British publicans
Great Lever F.C. players
Association football wingers
FA Cup Final players